J. A. Campbell may refer to:

 John Argentine Campbell (died 1917), Scottish rugby player
 James Campbell (rugby union) (James Alexander Campbell, 1858–1902), Canadian-born rugby player who represented Scotland
 John Allen Campbell (1835–1880), first Governor of the Wyoming Territory
 James Archibald Campbell (1862–1934), founder of Campbell University
 Jonathan A. Campbell (born 1947), American herpetologist

See also
Campbell (surname)